James E. Wilson (born ), was an American farmhand who was convicted of violent robbery by an Alabama court in 1958 and sentenced to death. His case became a cause célèbre due to the small amount stolen ($1.95) and that Wilson, as an African-American, was convicted by an all-white jury.

The case became a source of embarrassment for the United States at the height of the Cold War, as it suggested that American promotion of democratic principles overseas was hypocritical when it did not seem to uphold the same standards in its own states.

Biography
James Wilson was born in Alabama in 1904. He was illiterate.

Wilson was described as a "ne'er do well drifter", who was arrested eight times between 1929 and 1957. By the 1940 US Census, he was living with his wife in Marion, Perry County, Alabama. By 1957 he was a farmhand.

The case
James "Jimmy" Wilson was arrested on July 27, 1957, for stealing $1.95 at night from a 74-year-old white widow, Estelle Barker, in Marion, Alabama. Barker also testified that Wilson attempted to rape her, which he denied; although he was not indicted on this charge, as night-time robbery carried a harsher potential sentence. An all-white jury convicted Wilson of robbery, and the judge sentenced him to death by electrocution.

What counted against Wilson was that the robbery was violent (Wilson allegedly had choked Barker, attempted to rape her, and threatened her life), that it took place in the victim's home and that Wilson had previously served two prison terms for grand larceny. Wilson admitted he had been drinking heavily on the day of the incident, and that the robbery was premeditated.

Robbery in Alabama carried a possible death sentence at the time, albeit no one had ever been sentenced to death for stealing less than $5.

In September 1958, Wilson's two brothers hired Fred Gray as his legal representative.

The case was appealed to the Alabama Supreme Court, which upheld the death sentence. In its opinion, the Court stressed that the conviction was due to the violent nature of the robbery, and that "the amount of the money ... taken is immaterial."

International coverage
While it was difficult to find anyone who would speak in Wilson's defence in his home town, the case received international coverage, with critical articles appearing in newspapers all across the world. Protest groups were formed and petitions were sent demanding that the death sentence be overturned. The US embassy in London received approximately 600 protest letters. Jim Folsom, the Governor of Alabama (who opposed capital punishment), received over 1,000 letters per day urging clemency for Wilson of which he granted. The British Labour Party and the International Commission of Jurists likewise sent letters urging clemency. Even the Alabama-based Birmingham Post-Herald urged for clemency. The story was used as propaganda in the Communist press.

The US Secretary of State, John Foster Dulles sent a letter to Folsom notifying him of the immense international attention the case had received. The sentence was commuted to a life sentence by Folsom on September 29, 1958, which was the most he was legally able to do to aid Wilson. Folsom commented, "I admit that we have got the worst penal system in the world, including Dark Africa ... I hope the next Legislature will do something about improving the situation."

Wilson was paroled on October 1, 1973, at the age of 70 and having served 16 years in prison. The record after his release is silent.

References

Further reading
 Mary L. Dudziak, Cold War Civil Rights: Race and the Image of American Democracy (Berkeley, 2001).
 Wilson v. State

Year of birth uncertain
Year of death missing
1900s births
American prisoners sentenced to death
American robbers
American people convicted of robbery
African-American people
People from Perry County, Alabama
People paroled from life sentence
Prisoners sentenced to death by Alabama
Recipients of American gubernatorial clemency